The Georgetown street renaming occurred as a result of an 1895 act of the United States Congress that ended even the nominal independence of Georgetown from Washington, D.C.  The Act required, inter alia, that the street names in Georgetown be changed to conform to the street-naming system in use in the Northwest quadrant of Washington, D.C.  However, the old street names were shown on maps as late as 1899.

The lists below set forth the old and new names of Georgetown's streets.   Because most east–west streets are not continuous across Wisconsin Avenue, separate lists are provided for those east–west streets that are north of M Street and either east or west of Wisconsin Avenue.

North–south streets, east to west

East–west streets, south to north

M Street and south

North of M Street

References 

Geography of Washington, D.C.
History of Washington, D.C.
Streets in Washington, D.C.
Georgetown (Washington, D.C.)
Georgetown